The Point Men is a 2023 South Korean action crime thriller film directed by Yim Soon-rye and starring Hwang Jung-min and Hyun Bin. The film is based on the 2007 South Korean hostage crisis in Afghanistan and the subsequent rescue mission.
 It was released on January 18, 2023 in South Korea and screened in Dolby Atmos.

Synopsis

A story about a diplomat and a National Intelligence Service (NIS) agent who struggle and risk their lives on foreign soil to save Korean hostages that have been abducted in the Middle East. The film is based on true events of 2007 South Korean hostage crisis in Afghanistan, when 23 South Korean missionaries were captured and held hostage in Afghanistan. Hyun Bin playing a NIS agent conducts a rescue operation and negotiations with the help of diplomat played by Hwang Jung-min.

Cast
 Hwang Jung-min as Jung Jae-ho, diplomat
 Hyun Bin as Park Dae-sik, NIS agent
 Kang Ki-young as Qasim / Lee Bong-han  
 Jung Jae-sung as Vice Minister Kim  
 Kwon Hyuk as Secretary
 Bryan Larkin as Abdula
 Jeon Sung-woo as Secretary Cha
 Fahim Fazli Taliban leader
 Lee Seung-chul as Minister Choi
 Iyad Hajjaj as Minister of Foreign Affairs of Afghanistan
 Ahn Chang-hwan as Sim Bo-jung
 Park Hyung-soo

Production 

The film inspired by a true story of 23 South Korean Christian volunteers taken hostage by Taliban militants in Afghanistan in 2007, was to commence its filming in late March 2020, in Jordan, but due to the COVID-19 outbreak the shooting was postponed. After normalisation principal photography began in late April 2020. The actors and production team flew in July for Jordan schedule of filming. The shooting at Jordan was wrapped up in September 2020.

Release
The film was originally slated to be released in September 2022, but was postponed due to aftermath of COVID-19 and busy schedule of lead actors. In December 2022, with the release of trailer the theatrical release date of the film was announced for January 18, 2023. After the domestic release, the film is slated to release in North America on January 27, in Hong Kong and Macau on February 2, in Taiwan on February 3, in Philippines on February 8, in Cambodia on March 3, and in Thailand on March 23. The film was released in select theaters in the United States and Canada on January 27, 2023 by 815 Pictures.

Reception

Box office
The film was released on January 18, 2023 on 1289 screens. It opened at 1st place at the Korean box office with 104,798 admissions. The film topped the weekly collection on Korean box office for the week January 16 ~ 22 by collecting US$5,478,201 and 659,022 viewers. The film surpassed 1 million viewers in 7 days of its release. It recorded 1,023,232 cumulative audience on January 24. 

, with gross of US$13,471,119 and 1,720,005 admissions, it is the highest-grossing Korean film of 2023.

Critical response
Lee Da-won of Cine21 reviewing the film praised the performances of Hwang Jung-min and Hyun Bin, writing, "Thanks to the stable breathing of the two people, the attraction of the movie increases even more." Lee opined that though director Im Soon-rye's narration is "as expected neat and clear", but "the lack of catharsis in the 'narrative of defeating evil and rescuing the weak' is a major weakness that does not ensure the success of the film". Han Hyeon-jeong reviewing for Maeil Economy wrote that "there is little catharsis even in the more perfect coordination of the two perfect protagonists." Han liked the climax and Kang Ki-young's energy but felt film was "insipid". In conclusion, she wrote that "I don't think I'd like to recommend it to someone or experience it again."

References

External links
 
 
 
 The Point Men on Kofic
 
 
 The Point Men at Mojo

Films directed by Yim Soon-rye
2023 films
South Korean thriller drama films
South Korean crime drama films
Films shot in Jordan
2020s Korean-language films
South Korean films based on actual events
Films about hostage takings
Film productions suspended due to the COVID-19 pandemic
Films about diplomats
Films about the National Intelligence Service (South Korea)
Films set in 2006
Films set in Afghanistan
Films set in Karachi
Films set in Seoul
Works about the Taliban